Creative Playthings is the seventh album by Electric Company, released on October 5, 2004 through Tigerbeat6.

Track listing

Personnel 
Brad Laner – vocals, instruments, production
Chris Pitman – synthesizer
Tim Saputo – design
Terryn Westbrook – vocals

References 

2004 albums
Electric Company (band) albums
Tigerbeat6 albums